Solomon Joseph Silberstein (March 10, 1845 – January 21, 1919) was a Russian–American philosophical writer and poet.

Silberstein was born in Slobodka, Russian Empire, to Zibhya and Rabbi Aaron Silberstein. He was the grandson of the Kabbalist Naphtali Herz Ritever. Educated privately, he received the rabbinical diploma in 1864, and officiated from 1867 to 1868 as rabbi at Dershunisok, in the government of Kovno. He emigrated to the United States in 1881 and settled in New York City.

Publications

References
 

1845 births
1919 deaths
19th-century rabbis from the Russian Empire
19th-century American rabbis
20th-century American rabbis
Emigrants from the Russian Empire to the United States
Jewish philosophers
Jews and Judaism in New York City
People from Kovno Governorate
Philosophy writers
Rabbis from New York City
Writers from Kaunas
Writers from New York City